Huang Poren (born 1970), a Taiwanese sculptor, was born in Taichung, Taiwan. His ancestral homeland is Fujian, China. His grandfather and parents engaged in wood carving business. In his youth, he majored in sculpture at Fu-Hsin Trade & Art School. In 2001, Huang Poren had joined Graz International Sculpture Exhibition in Austria. He has also participated in several prominent art fairs in both Taiwan and overseas. His well-known pieces include aboriginal-figures and personified dogs. The National Taiwan Museum of Fine Art has already collected two of his works. His work "The Archer" has been published in textbooks for senior high school students in Taiwan.

Early life and family
Huang Poren was born into a family of woodcarvers in Dajia District, Taichung. Both his grandfather and father were engaged in the woodcarving business. During its heyday between 1960 and 1980, more than 100 woodcarvers were restlessly working at the Huang's woodcarving factory. They even had to sleep at the factory's dormitory at night. The scale of the woodcarving factory was very big; the products were exported to various countries. The land where the factory situated is very big and stored a lot of woodcrafts. A single piece of unprocessed high-end wood costs more than US$30,000 at that time. However, since the security system was not install during that time, the "Formosan Mountain Dogs" were used to guard the factory and home in order to prevent the woods from getting stolen. The Huang's Formosan Mountain Dogs have existed continuously for generation, hence Huang Poren grew up in an environment surrounded by sculptures and Formosan Mountain Dogs.

Huang Poren has an innate sense of delicacy and fancifulness. In today's society, he has his own distinct thoughts toward human nature and generational changes. He wants to transmit his thoughts through new art creations instead of duplicating craft (such as 80,000 pieces of the same Guan Gong sculptures). However, his father threatened to "renounce" him if he became an artist. He wanted him to continue producing wood sculptures, so that he could at least have a steady income. His father had no choice but to use the threatening tone because there were quite a few woodcarvers who had left the woodcarving factory in the hope of becoming romantic artists. However, they ended up suffering from the strain of poverty. Moreover, Huang Poren is the only male child in the family, as he has several sisters, but his father already advanced in age. Thus, his father was very worried that his son would be starved to death if pursued artistic works, he had no choice but to threaten him.

Through "The Dog's Notes", Huang Poren expresses that he will never abandon either his family or his creative artworks.

Since graduating from the sculpting group of Fu-Hsin Trade & Arts School in 1989, he did not run away from home like other romantic artists. Instead, he designated a small area at the factory for himself. He used wood, metal, rocks, and other cheap sculpting materials, and he strived to participate in sculpting competitions in various places. Throughout the years, he has received numerous awards. He has also attracted numerous visits from the media. His father then became aware of the matter, but he could not help in worrying his son.

Starting 2005, Huang Poren created "The Dog's Notes" to express his care and loyalty toward his family. Although the elders were not being understanding, he has tried really hard to express himself. While using humorous ways to convey his ideas, he has also demonstrated his determination for guarding the freedom of creative artworks. Like Formosan Mountain Dogs, he is loyal, pure, and courageous; he manifests the positive attitude as a whole. This is exactly the inspiration obtained from the Formosan Mountain Dogs in his home. In 2007, Poren Huang's father passed away. He accompanied his father through the last days of his life in the hospital and created the sculpture "Every Day is a New Start". He hopes that people can cherish every present moments and manifests golden-like positive radiance which shines eternally everyday in life.

Huang Poren's works became popular globally and continued to manifest positive attitudes which influence and touch a lot of people. Every sculptures are highly meaningful and have long-term mission, which is for the betterment of people in this 21st century, especially in the mind!

Style
Huang Poren's sculpture works concern Taiwanese aboriginals and Formosan Mountain Dog. Because of his great admiration for aboriginals' innocence and perseverance, the sculptor's early works, created from iron or wood, express their unique culture and difficult life vividly. With regard to "The Dog's Notes" series, those Formosan Mountain dogs raised by Huang Poren's family are a rich source of inspiration for him. It is taken for granted that dogs are the most trustworthy animal to human beings; however, dogs can also be a symbol of the dark sides to human character, as being snobbish or fawning. Some of Huang Poren's bronze dogs even resemble the appearance of a man.

The Dog's Notes
The Dog's Notes is not meant to be a lifelike sculpture, but a simplified approach to create an artistic concept. Poren Huang hopes to attract his audience, and hence deliberately enlarged the heads to render them amusing. Whether dog or human-like sculptures, the chest is often prominent. Since the chest of a short-haired dog tends to be protruding, Huang Poren exaggerated its perspective to emphasize confidence or a strong heart. In addition, the nose is also enlarged and the eyes omitted because dogs have weak eyesight but a sensitive sense of smell. The body of the sculpture tends to be strong and powerful, often with the head held high and even a little arrogant to arouse in audience the urge to whack its head. Due to their high melting points and durability, copper and the occasional stainless steel are mainly used in The Dog's Notes to emphasize eternity. Some of the works are welded with three layers of 99% pure gold foils to further convey the idea of light or extreme positivity. The Dog's Notes further emerges into two new series entitled "The Vision" and "i Dog".

Formosan Mountain Dogs
Formosan Mountain Dog, characterized by short black fur, upright curled tail, staunch loyalty to its master, strong learning ability, adaptability, and intelligence, became an inspiration to Huang Poren. Having once raised more than 20 dogs at the same time, Huang Poren had frequently helped in the birthing of puppies, and observed that many qualities of the breed, such as standing tall, positivity, and vibrant spirit, happened to be lacking in people living in modern society. On the other hand, people today are unable to cope with stress, and are often self-defeating and depressed. Moreover, the alienation between people, especially apathy among relatives, has resulted in modern people replacing humans with dogs for companionship because despite venting their emotional ups and downs on their pets, dogs remain faithful and obedient.

Humanized Dog Works
Using the dog as a creative starting point, each piece of work is suggestive of the "human". About 10% to 90% of the works borrow from the dog to explore various human behaviors. Modern people generally feel kindly toward dogs because of their ability to soothe. Therefore, Huang Poren uses the dog as his creative theme to convey positive traits such as self-confidence, courage, loyalty or innocence, and to provoke in people deeper thoughts as they come in contact with his work. Many people are first attracted by the amusing forms; however, after a period of contact and interaction with the pieces, they seem to sense the deeper significance and remain inspired by positive ideas and thoughts.

There are primarily two types of animals that appear in The Dog's Notes, the dog and the panda. They share a common characteristic of being humanized. These animals do not appear completely animal-like under Huang Poren's sculpting, but instead, they appear to have the scent of a human. That is why viewers tend to stand in front of the artwork and stare for quite a long time, unwittingly; perhaps it is because they did not get an affirmative answer as to whether the artwork is human or animal? When the dog and the panda enter the human's environment, they naturally learn to cohabitate with humans. They lose the wild nature of being wild animals, and become more humanized. People are the same way. Huang Poren wishes that humans can be more inspired by the dogs, and to learn the positive characters found in dogs, such as innocence, loyalty, kindness, bravery, and being passionate. Much like the Chinese proverb, "The son does not despise the mother for being ugly, and the dog does not blame the owner for being poor"; the dog will not despite the owner, and will not leave the owner, instead he will spend the rest of his life by his owner's side. Humans, on the other hand are different. They might look down on others or alienate others. They might even become disrespectful toward parents. The selfishness of humans causes wars and unrest in the world. Therefore, Poren Huang is not just creating artworks of animals, but instead, he is making his sculptures more humanized, so that the viewers can naturally reflect and be inspired.

In addition, Huang Poren's humanized works of art also have a little bit of the "Oriental Literati" essence. Although these artworks will have various emotions, but they are never too intense, and are never over the top. Just like Ang Lee, Xi Jinping, Yo-Yo Ma, Jeremy Lin, as well as other generally well-known Chinese, whose personalities are perhaps the same way, which is gentle and refined, and with the modesty of a gentleman. Much like the Eastern literai who are well read of poetry and literature, their emotions are not easily shown; they are more restrained, and are full of character and depth.

Confucianism
During the 1970s, Huang Poren's father, Huang Mingde, had a successful wood carving industry and huge export volume. As a major wood carving factory in Taiwan, the factory employed more than 100 craftsmen to produce wood handicrafts during peak seasons. Huang Mingde expected his son Huang Poren to inherit the family business, but Huang Poren preferred artistic creation to wood handicraft production, resulting in years of differences between the father and son. In 2005, Huang Poren fully expressed his ideas through his series of works, The Dog's Notes. Although he and his father held different viewpoints, he highly values family interaction. He focused on mending his family relationship before pursuing his personal ambition, and some of his works in The Dog's Notes strongly convey enlightenment and morality. After World War II, with the recovery of the global economy, prosperity and focus on human rights, the hard work of the previous generation is often reciprocated with the disregard, self-centeredness, mockery and impiety of the next generation. In The Dog's Notes, Huang Poren added the quality of loyalty and kindness to purify the human heart and create positive influence.

Strict creating attitude
One mold can reproduce 1–2 bronze sculptures. Most artists use the same mold to reproduce all versions of bronze sculptures, whether there are 20 or 30 versions. Molds can only be used for a certain period of time; most artists use molds continuously, considering replacement only after severe deformation because the bronze sculpture produced will be rather different than the original. Although most people cannot find differences with the naked eye, the artist can definitely spot them. Some sculptures have up 99, 200 or more versions, where the same mold is used; however, Huang Poren insists that a mold can only be used twice, at most.

Therefore, if a bronze sculpture has 20 versions, he would have to make the mold 10 times. While this requires a lot of time and work, Huang Poren insists on this. His demands towards the completeness of his works are very high, not allowing even 0.01% of error. Since any slight difference can change the entire feeling, so each version of the sculpture are in line with what he wants, maintaining the best artistic quality.

Huang Poren is an extremely picky artist; if he is not satisfied with the artwork reproduced (if there are too many differences from that of the original) by the copper factory, He will ask the copper factory to reproduce another, absorbing all additional costs. Very few sculptors do this, even if they are not satisfied, they will not return the end product. This is why sometimes it takes Huang Poren more than four months to produce a sculpture. He also insists on not hiring assistants, so he only sleeps four hours a day, resting only on Chinese New Years. Apart from that, he is always working, making sure the proportion of the lines and blocks of every piece are what he desires.

When comparing same size bronze sculptures of different artist, Huang Poren's work is relatively heavier because he uses maximum thickness, so when picked up there is a particularly heavy feeling (for handmade pieces the flow of melting copper are controlled by the artist, resulting in different weights of each piece). He gives each piece the highest artistic quality, wishing his artwork can last thousands of years. As a result, his works come at a great cost.　The artwork is not only a symbol of expensive decorative taste for the home, but also a sacred domain for the soul. Everybody works hard his/her entire life to make him/herself better. Let us be content easily, like dogs. Let us be pure, confident, humorous, and joyful, so that our lives will shine positive light every day.

Exhibitions
Huang Poren’s sculptures have become incorporated into textbooks, and hence his works have become collections in galleries across Taiwan. In addition, his works have also gained increasing popular with private collectors, especially in Hong Kong, Beijing, Taipei, Singapore, Seoul and Tokyo, and is gradually including the Middle East, Europe and the US. Huang Poren encourages his collectors to play with and touch his works, and through the constant contact, feel the profound heritage within the creations. One collector initially thought of The Dog's Notes as rugged, but through constant handling and awareness, realized that The Dog's Notes is in fact extremely refined. Each faintly discernible line and block manifests a different pose, and the more interaction with the works, the more feelings are discovered. The artistic unity of the heart and mind with the works happens only through precise manipulation with the fingers, which is a type of art therapy. In addition to appreciating each piece of work in The Dog's Notes with the naked eyes, the most important is the passion arising from the interaction of mind and body as a result of touching. Each staggered arrangement of explicit and implicit lines reveals unlimited artistic character while narrowing the distance between the viewer and work until the two becomes one. The indubitable intimacy, quiet and reliable sense of security, and inspiration to deeper meaning make The Dog's Notes an artistic feast. The artist has not only become the Creator, creating the true meaning of freedom and creating a personal world view, but has also become the observer endowed with a limited life that offers infinite possibilities!

Collections
In the Art Taipei 2006 art fair, his work, "Happy Time(2006)", was acquired by the National Taiwan Museum of Fine Arts, which again acquired another of his work, Wise Man, during the Art Taipei 2008.

Publications
 2003: "Flying Over The Jurassic Period" by Jin-Lung Chen, Published by Taiwan Daily, Taipei Taiwan.
 2005: "The Dog’s Notes: vivid Bronze Dogs" by Ming-Hui Chang, Published by United Daily News, Taipei, Taiwan.
 2005: "Huang Po-Ren Sculpture: Iron. Wood. Forest; The Dog’s Notes" by Huang Poren, Published by Taichung County Cultural Center, Taichung, Taiwan.
 2006: "Huang Poren's Sculptures expresses the spirit of The Formosan Dogs", A6, Published By Min Sheng Daily, Taipei, Taiwan.
 2006: "The Dog's Notes", Published by Taiwan News, Taipei, Taiwan.
 2009: "Huang Poren Transforms the traditional wood sculpture into Modern Art" by Chen-yin Hsu. Published by Commercial Times.
 2011: "Exploring the relationship between dogs and human" by Fu-Chen Tsai, Published by Merit Times Co., Ltd.
 2014: "The Dog's Notes" by Huang Poren, Published by Powen Gallery, Taipei, Taiwan.
 2015: "The Loved One" on the cover of Artco Magazine, Published by Art & Collection Group, Taipei, Taiwan.
 2015: "Return to Innocence-Huang Poren's "The Dog's Notes" by Max Chaplin, Artco no.268, p82-p89, Published by Art & Collection Group, Taipei, Taiwan.
 2015: "Huang Poren—Iron Wood Forest and The Dog's Notes" By Powen Lee, Artco no.269, p156-p157, Published by Art & Collection Group, Taipei, Taiwan.
 2016: Spielzeug und Vorbild: Die Hundeskulpturen des taiwanesischen Künstlers Poren Huang", The Coverage by Susanne Braun for the exhibition in Berlin.
 2016: "Bright Star overseas-Poren Huang and Powen Gallery", Art. Investment no.99, p94-p97, Published by Art & Collection Group, Taipei, Taiwan.
 2015: Dog Philosophy—Life Revelation of Huang Poren by Chen Fanling, Art. Investment no.89, p196-p197, Published by Art & Collection Group, Taipei, Taiwan.
 2016: "Look at those dogs!  On Huang Poren's Spiritual Metonymy", Featured Article by Wu,Shuann, Artco no.287, p68-p71, Published by Art & Collection Group, Taipei, Taiwan.
 2016: "THE DOG'S NOTES BY Huang Poren", Featured Article by NICOLAS SIMONEAU, KALTBLUT Magazine, ART Section, Published by Marcel Schlutt and Nicolas Simoneau, Berlin.
 2016: "Marching Forward Alongside Eagle With Head Held High" by Chang Li-Hao, Artco no.290, p106-p109, Published by Art & Collection Group, Taipei, Taiwan.
 2017: "Huang Poren'S PHILOSOPHY ON ART AND INTERNATIONAL OUTLOOK" by Clément Rechaussat, Artco no.292, p52-p59, Published by Art & Collection Group, Taipei, Taiwan.

References

External links
ARTCO Magazine
KALTBLUT Magazine
Poren Huang and "The Dog's Notes"
Art@ Berlin
 Sinovision Journal
 New Taiwan
CTV News
TVBS News
The Dog's Notes-Year 2005/2006
NY Arts

Taiwanese sculptors
1970 births
Living people